Israel was present at the Eurovision Song Contest 1991, held in Rome, Italy. The Israeli broadcaster IBA continued to use a national final, Kdam Eurovision to select their entry.

Before Eurovision

Kdam Eurovision 1991 
The final was held of 27 March 1991, and was hosted by Danny Roup and Shira Gera. 12 songs competed in the final held of 27 March 1991, where 7 regional juries chose the winner. There was an orchestra however, 
it was still performed in playback. After the 12 songs were performed, Daniel Pe'er hosted an awarding show of all Israeli Shows. Voting was done after the awarding.

The winner was Duo Datz with the song "Kan".

At Eurovision
Duo Datz performed 15th on the night of the contest, following Norway and preceding Finland. At the close of the voting it had received 139 points, placing 3rd in a field of 22.

Voting

References

1991
Countries in the Eurovision Song Contest 1991
Eurovision